The black-headed tailorbird (Orthotomus nigriceps) is a songbird species in the family Cisticolidae. It was formerly included in the "Old World warbler" assemblage. The species is sexually monomorphic in the adult plumage.

It is native to the southeastern Philippine islands of (eastern) Mindanao, Dinagat and Siargao. Specimens from Dinagat and Siargao have brighter, yellower ventral plumage and have been described as O. nigriceps luminosus.

References

black-headed tailorbird
Birds of Mindanao
Endemic birds of the Philippines
black-headed tailorbird
black-headed tailorbird
Taxonomy articles created by Polbot